Bes (also spelled as Bisu), together with his feminine counterpart Beset, is an ancient Egyptian deity worshipped as a protector of households and, in particular, of mothers, children, and childbirth. Bes later came to be regarded as the defender of everything good and the enemy of all that is bad. Bes may have been a Middle Kingdom import from Nubia or Somalia, and his cult did not become widespread until the beginning of the New Kingdom. 

Worship of Bes spread as far north as the area of Syria and as far west as the Balearic Islands (Ibiza) in Spain, and later into the Roman and Achaemenid Empires.

Worship 

Bes was a household protector, becoming responsible – throughout ancient Egyptian history – for such varied tasks as killing snakes, fighting off evil spirits, watching after children, and aiding women in labour by fighting off evil spirits, and thus present with Taweret at births.

Images of the deity, quite different from those of the other gods, were kept in homes. Normally Egyptian gods were shown in profile, but instead Bes appeared in full face portrait, ithyphallic, and sometimes in a soldier's tunic, so as to appear ready to launch an attack on any approaching evil. He scared away demons from houses, so his statue was put up as a protector.
Since he drove off evil, Bes also came to symbolize the good things in life – music, dance, and sexual pleasure. In the New Kingdom, tattoos of Bes could be found on the thighs of dancers, musicians and servant girls. Many instances of Bes masks and costumes from the New Kingdom and later have been uncovered. These show considerable wear, thought to be too great for occasional use at festivals, and are therefore thought to have been used by professional performers, or given out for rent.

Later, in the Ptolemaic period of Egyptian history, chambers were constructed, painted with images of Bes and his wife Beset, thought by Egyptologists to have been for the purpose of curing fertility problems or general healing rituals.

Like many Egyptian gods, the worship of Bes or Beset was exported overseas. While the female variant had been more popular in Minoan Crete, the male version would prove popular with the Phoenicians and the ancient Cypriots. The Balearic island of Ibiza derives its name from the god's name, brought along with the first Phoenician settlers in 654 BC. These settlers, amazed at the lack of any sort of venomous creatures on the island, thought it to be the island of Bes (<איבשם> ʔybšm, *ʔibošim, yibbōšīm "dedicated to Bes"). Later the Roman name Ebusus was derived from this designation.

At the end of the 6th century BC, images of Bes began to spread across the Achaemenid Empire, which Egypt belonged to at the time. Images of Bes have been found at the Persian capital of Susa, and as far away as central Asia. Over time, the image of Bes became more Persian in style, as he was depicted wearing Persian clothes and headdress.

Iconography 
Modern scholars such as James Romano claim that in its earliest inception Bes was a representation of a lion rearing up on its hind legs. After the Third Intermediate Period, Bes is often seen as just the head or the face, often worn as amulets.

Popular culture 
 Bes appears, as part of the delegation of Egyptian gods, in The Sandman: Season of Mists (December 1990 – July 1991), by Neil Gaiman.
 Bes appears as a trickster in Mummies Alive! (1997) animated series.
Bes appears as a character in Otherland: volume 3 Mountain of Black Glass (1999) by Tad Williams. His physical description reflects traditional iconography. 
 Bes is a friend and helper to the heroes in Pyramid Scheme (2001) by Eric Flint and Dave Freer.
 Bes appears, as a god of love in the Egyptian movie Secret Service Suitor (Aris min geha amneya) (2004). 
 Bes is an important character in the books of the saga The Kane Chronicles (2010–2012) by Rick Riordan.
 Bes appears in the video game Realm of the Mad God (2011) as a boss of an Egyptian themed dungeon known as the "Tomb of the Ancients", alongside Nut and Geb.
 Bes appears in “the Nikopol Trilogy” (1980-1992), by Enki Bilal, alongside several of the ancient gods of Egypt, hovering over a dystopian Paris and world.

Bibliography 

 The Complete Gods and Goddesses of Ancient Egypt, Richard H. Wilkinson. 
 The Oxford History of Ancient Egypt, Ian Shaw.

References

Further reading 
Dasen, Veronique (2013). Dwarfs in Ancient Egypt and Greece. Oxford: Oxford University Press. 

Arts gods
Domestic and hearth gods
Egyptian gods
Fertility gods
Childhood gods
Fortune gods
Tutelary gods
Love and lust gods